The Xplorer is a class of diesel multiple unit trains built by ABB Transportation. Initially entering service in October 1993, the Xplorers are mechanically identical to the Endeavour Railcars, though feature a higher level of passenger amenity. All 23 carriages were built in Dandenong, Victoria. The Xplorers currently operate under NSW TrainLink, running on the regional Main North, Main Western and Main Southern lines throughout New South Wales.

History 

Following the election of the Greiner Government in March 1988, consulting firm Booz Allen Hamilton was commissioned to prepare a report into NSW rail services. On purely economic grounds, the report recommended closing all country passenger services as they were judged unviable, however this was not politically acceptable. If services were to be maintained, the report recommended an 'all XPT' option supported by an expanded coach network.

This option was taken up by the government and a new timetable introduced in February 1990. One of the casualties was the Northern Tablelands Express from Sydney to Armidale which was operated on alternate days by a locomotive hauled HUB/RUB set and XPT. This was truncated back to Tamworth allowing it to be operated by one XPT as a day return service. A road coach from Sydney to Armidale was introduced. Another service to be replaced by coach was the Werris Creek to Moree connecting service that was operated by a DEB set.After suffering a number of losses in northern NSW electorates where services were cut during the March 1990 Federal Election, the National Party decided a policy reversal was needed. In June 1990, the government announced that it would purchase 17 Xplorer carriages to reintroduce services to Armidale and Moree and replace locomotive hauled stock and coaches on services to Canberra. This would release an XPT to operate a daily service to Grafton. The Xplorers entered service on the North Western service in October 1993 and on the Canberra service in December 1993. In November 1994, the government ordered a further four Xplorer carriages.

From May 2000, Xplorers took over the weekly services to Griffith and Broken Hill.

All are scheduled to be replaced by the NSW TrainLink Regional Train Project. A contract with CAF was signed in February 2019, with the Xplorers to be replaced from 2023.

Service 
The Xplorers currently operate on these services out of Sydney:
 Armidale and Moree: the Armidale/Moree Xplorer daily service runs along the Main North line to Werris Creek where the train divides. One portion continues on the Main North line and proceeds to Armidale, while the other transfers onto the Mungindi line to Moree. The Armidale portion normally consists of three carriages and the Moree portion two. During times of high demand these can be built up to four and three carriages respectively.
 Canberra: 3 services each direction per day, running along the Main Southern and Bombala lines. Normally operated by a three carriage set but during times of high demand these can be built up to four.
 Griffith: service is attached to a Canberra Xplorer service until Goulburn on Saturdays and Wednesdays only, and operates to Griffith via the Main Southern, Hay and Yanco-Griffith lines. Service returns on Sundays joining an Xplorer from Canberra at Goulburn although on occasions when either train runs late, each will run separately to Sydney. Normally operated by two or three carriages.
 Broken Hill: the Outback Xplorer service runs along the Main Western and Broken Hill lines to Broken Hill. Outbound service operates Monday, returning Tuesday. Normally operated by three carriages.

Carriages 

Coding for the carriages are as follows:
 EA First Class Driving Power Car: First Class seating, Buffet and Satellite Telephone. Capacity 42 passengers.
 EB Economy Class Intermediate Power Car: Economy Class seating and Toilet. Capacity 66 Passengers.
 EC Economy Class Driving Power Car: Economy Class seating, Disabled toilet with baby change facilities, wheelchair space and booked Luggage space. Capacity 38 passengers.

Carriage numbering is as follows:
 EA 2501-2508
 EB 2511-2517
 EC 2521-2528

EA 2508 and EC 2528 used to be Endeavour railcars LE 2815 and TE 2865. They became available following the electrification of the South Coast line from Dapto to Kiama, and were converted to Xplorers by Bombardier Transportation, Dandenong. The conversion of these two vehicles enabled the reintroduction of a rail service to Broken Hill as the Outback Xplorer, originally known as the Silver City Xplorer.

The transmission incorporates a Voith KB260/r hydrodynamic brake. An auxiliary  Cummins LT10R(G) diesel engine drives a Newage Stamford UCI274F alternator to supply power for the air conditioning and lighting.

Refurbishment 

In October 2006, RailCorp issued a tender for the refurbishment of the Xplorer and Endeavour railcars. The contract specified new seating, buffet upgrades, new carpets, toilet upgrades, DVA upgrades, extended booked luggage section, and more wheelchair spaces for the trains. Bombardier Transportation, Downer Rail and United Group Rail responded, with Bombardier being the successful bidder. All units were repainted into new CountryLink colours. The refurbishment started in mid-2007 and concluded at the end of 2008. After the creation of NSW TrainLink, the CountryLink branding was removed from the trains.

References 

ABB multiple units
CountryLink
Diesel multiple units of New South Wales
NSW TrainLink
Train-related introductions in 1993